Qayqu (Quechua for a type of hunt, hispanicized spelling Jaico) is a mountain in the Paryaqaqa mountain range in the Andes of Peru, about  high. It is situated in the Lima Region, Huarochirí Province, Quinti District. It lies southwest of Qullqi P'ukru.

References 

Mountains of Peru
Mountains of Lima Region